This is a list of men's college ice hockey coaches with 400 career wins.

Jerry York, who has coached men's ice hockey for 49 years at Clarkson University, Bowling Green State University and Boston College is the all-time and active leader in wins, losses and ties.

With 894 wins in 40 years at Boston University, Jack Parker is the all-time leader in wins with a single program.

Among the coaches with at least 400 wins, the leader in winning percentage is Tim Coghlin with .771, all at St. Norbert College.

List of coaches with at least 400 wins
Statistics correct as of the end of the 2021–22 college men's ice hockey season.

Active coaches nearing 400 wins
Coaches within 30 wins of reaching 400 for their career (as of the end of the 2021–22 season).

Notes
Shawn Walsh finished his career with 399 wins, however, that total excludes the 27 wins he was forced to vacate as part of a pair of NCAA rulings on player ineligibility.

References

 
Coaches with 400 wins
Ice Hockey, Men